Khadija Mardi (born 1 February 1991), also known as Khadija El Mardi, is a Moroccan boxer. She competed in the women's middleweight event at the 2016 Summer Olympics. She lost to Dariga Shakimova in the quarter-finals. She qualified to represent Morocco at the 2020 Summer Olympics, however, she withdrew from the competition due to medical reasons. In 2022 she won the gold medal in the African boxing championships.

References

External links

 

 
 
 

1991 births
Living people
Moroccan women boxers
Olympic boxers of Morocco
Boxers at the 2016 Summer Olympics
Sportspeople from Casablanca
Competitors at the 2019 African Games
African Games medalists in boxing
African Games gold medalists for Morocco
AIBA Women's World Boxing Championships medalists
Middleweight boxers
21st-century Moroccan women